Eunidia tanzanicola is a species of beetle in the family Cerambycidae. It was described by Pierre Téocchi and Jérôme Sudre in 2003.

References

Eunidiini
Beetles described in 2003